JSCC may be refer to:

 Jacobite Syrian Christian Church, an Indian autonomous Oriental Orthodox church
 Joint Support Coordination Cell, planned security and defence (CSDP) body of the European Union's (EU) European External Action Service